Ireland–Israel relations are foreign relations between Ireland and Israel.

History
Since 25 January 1996, Ireland has an embassy in Tel Aviv and Israel has an embassy in Dublin. The Israeli ambassador to Ireland is Ophir Kariv and the Irish ambassador to Israel is Kyle O'Sullivan. Both countries are full members of the Union for the Mediterranean.

Ireland only extended de jure recognition to Israel in 1963, and both countries established diplomatic relations in 1975, when Ireland's ambassador to Switzerland was also accredited to Israel. Prior to that, Ireland had refused to establish relations due to Israel's alleged violations of UN Resolutions. In 1981, however, Ireland condemned Israel's attack on Iraq's nuclear reactor. Ireland did not allow an Israeli embassy to open until 20 December 1993. Two weeks prior to that, Ireland had allowed PLO Leader Yasser Arafat to visit and open a delegation.

During the 20th century both the Irish and the Jews provided each other with moral support for the war effort for independence against the British, when the Irish fighting tactics inspired the Jews in their fight in Mandatory Palestine for independence. For example, Yitzhak Shamir, inspired by the IRA fighter Michael Collins, applied in the Lehi the policy that every fighter would have to carry a weapon with him at all times. Shamir's underground nickname, "Michael", (pronounced [miχaˈʔel]) was based on the name of Michael Collins.

In 1978, the Irish Army contributed forces to Lebanon as part of UNIFIL, a UN peacekeeping force in Southern Lebanon, which was the scene of fierce fighting between Israeli forces and their proxy militias and Lebanese guerillas. From 1978 to 2000, Ireland contributed over 40,000 troops to UNIFIL, and was the country's largest military involvement outside its own borders. Tensions erupted between the two countries over alleged mistreatment of Irish forces by the Israel Defense Forces. Throughout the 1980s and 1990s, the Irish Government regularly called the Israelis to criticise them over their treatment of Irish peacekeepers. Irish Foreign Minister Brian Lenihan said that much of his sympathy for Israel disappeared when he saw how Irish soldiers were treated. Irish forces were a major participant in the Battle of At Tiri, where UNIFIL troops withstood an attack by the South Lebanon Army, an Israeli-backed militia, after it attempted to set up a checkpoint in At Tiri. One Irish soldier was killed in the battle. Following the 2006 Lebanon War, Ireland deployed a unit of 150 troops to protect Finnish Army engineers.

In 1978, Aer Lingus, the national airline of Ireland, without prior agreement with the Irish government, secretly trained Egyptian Air Force pilots, at a time when Israel and Egypt were still in peace talks, and had yet to sign a treaty.

In 2003, the Irish government opposed the building of Israel's security wall in the West Bank.

According to WikiLeaks, following the 2006 Lebanon War, Ireland sought to "limit US weapons transfers to Israel" through its territory and Shannon Airport.

In 2010, Boaz Moda'i was named Israel's ambassador to Ireland. In 2012, Nurit Tinari-Modai, wife the ambassador Boaz Moda'i, was appointed deputy ambassador. Noting that the appointment would be "reviewed annually", an Israeli Foreign Ministry source stated that Tinari-Modai was a "professional diplomat" who could have "secured a full ambassadorship on her own merits".

In March 2013, Alan Shatter, minister of Justice, Equality and Defence said, while visiting Israel, that "Ireland is a friend of Israel. We have a government in Ireland that wants a deeper engagement. But we also have a government in Ireland that is committed to the peace process." During that trip, it was announced that Ireland and Israel would start an initiative to work closely together on reducing road deaths in both countries.

In May 2014, the Anti-Defamation League (ADL) published the "ADL Global 100 survey" into global anti-Semitism. The survey ranked Ireland as "in the middle in comparison with other countries in Western Europe" in terms of responses to questions on attitudes to Israel and to Jewish people.

In September 2014, Irish UN peacekeepers on the Golan Heights rescued Filipino colleagues who were surrounded by  Islamist extremists. Senior sources confirmed that Irish soldiers would "almost certainly" have been killed or taken hostage if it wasn't for the military intervention of the Israeli army, and that assistance from the Israeli army was "decisive" in the success of the rescue.

In November 2015, Alison Kelly became Ireland's ambassador to Israel, replacing Eamonn McKee. Kelly presented her credentials to Israeli President Reuven Rivlin noting her goal to "continue to work to strengthen and expand the cooperation between our countries". Also in 2015, Zeev Boker became the Israeli ambassador to the Republic of Ireland, presenting his credentials to the President of Ireland, Michael D. Higgins.

As of 2019, Ireland's ambassador to Israel was Kyle O'Sullivan, and Ophir Kariv had replaced Zeev Boker as Israel's ambassador to Ireland.

Commercial ties and tourism 
The commercial relationship between Israel and Ireland goes back to the early days of Israeli statehood. In 1988, Israeli exports to Ireland were valued at $23.5 million, while Irish exports to Israel were valued at $32.8 million. In 2010 Israeli imports from Ireland approached $520 million and exports to Ireland stood at $81 million.

Israeli exports to Ireland include machinery and electronics, rubber and plastics, chemicals, textiles, optical/medical equipment, gems, and fruit and vegetables. Irish exports to Israel include machinery and electronics, chemicals, textiles, foodstuffs, beverages, and optical/medical equipment. A bilateral agreement on double taxation signed in 1995 has facilitated economic cooperation.

In August 2014 controversy erupted when it became public that Ireland had approved export licences for military goods worth up to €6.4m to be shipped to Israel over the previous three years. Opposition parties complained that the types of materials sold to Israel were being kept secret from the Irish public. While the Irish government refused to give exact details on the type of equipment, updated figures showed military licences totalling €126,637 had been approved in advance of the 2014 Gaza conflict. Sinn Féin's Pádraig Mac Lochlainn and Fianna Fáil senator Averil Power demanded more transparency over the export approvals.

According to Haaretz newspaper, Ireland was the most popular destination for Israeli holidaymakers in 2000. In 2004, a peak number of Irish nationals visited Israel to attend the Ireland-Israel World Cup qualifying match.

Country comparison

Ireland and the Israeli–Palestinian conflict 
Ireland annually provides €10 million in bilateral and multilateral aid to the Palestinian people and organizations, including €3.5 million through the UNRWA.

On 19 January 2010, Mahmoud al-Mabhouh, a senior Hamas military commander, was assassinated in Dubai by a team of eight suspected Mossad officers who used counterfeit European passports, including Irish passports. The Irish government responded by expelling a staff member of the Israeli Embassy in Dublin. Ireland subsequently delayed an EU–Israel agreement which would involve allowing Israel to access sensitive information on EU citizens, and demanded that Israel tighten its data protection laws.

On 5 June 2010, the humanitarian aid vessel MV Rachel Corrie sailing from Ireland (where she had been refitted) to Gaza, was intercepted and seized by the Israeli Navy. This caused political tension between Ireland and Israel.

On 25 January 2011, Ireland upgraded the Palestinian envoy in Ireland to that of a full embassy, which resulted in the Irish Ambassador to Israel being summoned. Israel announced that it "regrets" the decision and it was "not surprised" due to the Irish government's "biased policy regarding the conflict over the years".

On 4 November 2011, the Irish ship MV Saoirse travelling to Gaza was intercepted by the Israeli Navy in international waters. The Navy boarded the ship, took those aboard in custody and towed it to Ashdod. In response, Irish Tánaiste and Minister for Foreign Affairs Eamon Gilmore stated that the Irish government do "not agree with [the Gaza blockade], (...) regard it as contrary to international humanitarian law in its impact on the civilian population of Gaza, and (...) have repeatedly urged Israel to end a policy which is unjust, counter-productive and amounts to collective punishment of 1.5 million Palestinians."

On 16 November 2011, unnamed sources from the Israeli Foreign Ministry claimed that "Ireland (is the) most hostile country in Europe" and was "pushing all of Europe's countries to a radical and uncompromising approach". The unnamed official made an accusation that "the Irish government is feeding its people with anti-Israel hatred" and that "what we are seeing here is clear anti-Semitism." The subsequent survey by the Anti-Defamation League of worldwide anti-Semitism proved that the unnamed source was incorrect, since Ireland was found to have less anti-Semitism than the average of European countries and a more favourable view of Israel. Additionally, an official from the Irish Foreign Affairs Department countered that "the Government is critical of Israeli policies in the occupied Palestinian territories. It is not hostile to Israel and it is clearly wrong to suggest as much," he said. "The notion that this Government is or would be trying to stoke up anti-Israeli feeling is untrue. We are not hostile to Israel. We are critical of policies, particularly in the occupied Palestinian territories. These are not the same things". Israel's ambassador to Ireland was reported as distancing himself from claims of Irish anti-Semitism.

In December 2012 the IsraelinIreland posted on the Embassy's Facebook page a comment that was viewed as racist and slanderous to Palestinians: "A thought for Christmas. … If Jesus and mother Mary were alive today, they would, as Jews without security, probably end up being lynched in Bethlehem by hostile Palestinians. Just a thought ...". The post resulted in protests, and the Embassy removed the statement issuing an apology, and posted the following statement: "To whom it may concern: An image of Jesus and Mary with a derogatory comment about Palestinians was posted without the consent of the administrator of the Facebook page. We have removed the post in question immediately. Apologies to anyone who may have been offended. Merry Christmas!"

In early 2012 the Irish Palestine Solidarity Campaign organised a "cultural boycott" of Israel, as a result of which Irish music group Dervish cancelled a proposed tour of Israel, citing "an 'avalanche of negativity' and 'venom' directed towards them." This online campaign was officially condemned by Irish Justice Minister Alan Shatter and Irish Tánaiste and Minister for Foreign Affairs Eamon Gilmore.

In June 2012, Israel's Channel 10 published an e-mail in which Nurit Tinari-Modai, deputy ambassador to Ireland, proposed harassing expatriate Israelis who criticized Israeli policies, posting photos of them and publishing disinformation that would embarrass them. She claimed that they were critical of Israel because of their sexual identity. The Foreign Ministry quickly distanced itself from her letter, disavowing her approaches to handling critics. Her recommendation included the following: "You have to try and hit their soft underbellies, to publish their photographs, maybe that will cause embarrassment from their friends in Israel and their family, hoping that local activists would understand that they may actually be working on behalf of Mossad."

In September 2013 Israeli soldiers clashed with Palestinians, EU diplomats (including an Irish diplomat) and foreign activists at the site of a West Bank village demolished by the Israel Defense Forces. The diplomats were manhandled.

On 31 July 2014 on the 23rd day of the 2014 Israel–Gaza conflict, Ireland's Foreign Minister Charlie Flanagan said he shared "the horror and revulsion of senators and very many of our citizens at the horrendous scenes we have witnessed since the start of the Israeli military operation." The Irish government, he said, condemned "both the unacceptably high civilian casualty rate resulting from disproportionate military action on Israel's part as well as the firing of rockets by Hamas and other militants into Israel." The Israeli embassy in Dublin came under criticism twice in the month of July 2014, first for posts likening Free Palestine activists to Hitler, and second for posting edited images of iconic European art in ways that imply Islam is taking over Europe (see Islam in Europe and Islamophobic incidents). The image of the Irish Molly Malone statue was edited by the Israeli Embassy to show her covered with a Muslim veil along with the words, "Israel now, Dublin next." Following criticism that the anti-Muslim posting promoted hatred and were offensive, they were taken down. The embassy claims it meant no offence.

In October 2014, the Irish upper house of parliament called on the government to give formal recognition to the State of Palestine and take active steps to promote a viable two-state solution to the Israeli-Palestinian conflict.

On 22 October 2014, the Seanad (Irish upper house of parliament) passed a motion calling on the government to give formal recognition to the State of Palestine and take active steps to promote a viable two-state solution to the Israeli-Palestinian conflict. The move follows similar initiatives in other European states, including Sweden and the United Kingdom. While Prime Minister Benjamin Netanyahu and most Israelis are opposed to the establishment of a Palestinian state within the pre-1967 borders, in December 2014 a petition was sent by over 800 Israelis asking Ireland to offer Palestine this recognition. The petition was sent to Ireland's Lower House ahead of a recognition vote already approved in the Upper House. Signatories to the letter included three well-known authors, Amos Oz and A.B. Yehoshua, both Israel Prize winners, and David Grossman, as well as former Foreign Ministry director-general Alon Liel. Subsequently, the Irish government announced that it would accept a motion proposing the recognition of Palestine, with 1967 borders and with East Jerusalem as the capital, as specified in U.N. resolutions. According to the Jerusalem Post, European countries have become frustrated with Israel, since peace talks have collapsed and Israel is still building settlements in Palestinian territories. Ireland will not be alone in recognising Palestine; Sweden became the largest Western European country to offer Palestine recognition, and parliaments in Spain, Britain and France have backed resolutions in favour of recognition. However, the Spanish and British governments, are at this time, refusing to recognise a Palestinian state.

In January 2018, Senator Frances Black proposed a private member's bill in the Irish Seanad which would have criminalised the purchase of goods and services from settlements in occupied territories, including Israeli settlements in the West Bank.  The Control of Economic Activity (Occupied Territories) Bill 2018 was opposed by the Government and voting on the Bill has been postponed.

On 9 April 2018 Dublin City Council became the first European capital to vote in favour of resolutions endorsing the Boycott, Divestment and Sanctions (BDS) movement against Israel  and calling for the expulsion of the Israeli Ambassador to Ireland.  The City Council boycott motion included a specific call to boycott products and services from Hewlett Packard.  On 10 April, the Lord Mayor of Dublin Mícheál Mac Donncha travelled to Ramallah to attend a Palestinian Authority conference on the status of Jerusalem, avoiding an Israeli government ban due to confusion arising from the spelling of his name in Irish on his passport.   In response, the Israeli government summoned the Irish Ambassador to formally demand an explanation for the boycott motions of Dublin City Council and the Lord Mayor's attendance at the conference.

In 2019, despite opposition from the Government of Ireland, the Dáil passed the second stage of the 'Occupied Territories Bill' by 78 to 45 votes.  If fully enacted, it will restrict the importation of goods that originated from any of the Israeli-occupied territories, including the settlements in the West Bank, Golan Heights and East Jerusalem. The Israeli ambassador to Ireland, Ophir Kariv said "it would make Ireland the most extreme anti-Israel country in the western world and entrench it deeply on the wrong side of history.", while supporters of Boycott, Divestment, Sanctions policies reportedly described the bill as a "victory for the BDS movement" and Trócaire's chief executive, Caoimhe de Barra said it would serve as a good example for the rest of the European Union.

In May 2021, the Dáil declared that the building of Israeli settlements on Palestinian land was de facto annexation, becoming the first EU member state to do so. The motion proposing the declaration was proposed by the opposition, and was supported by the Government. An amendment calling for the expulsion of the Israeli ambassador was defeated.

See also
 International recognition of Israel
 History of the Jews in Ireland

Notes

References

External links
 Irish embassy in Tel Aviv
 Israeli embassy in Dublin
IIA - Ireland Israel Alliance

 
Israel
Bilateral relations of Israel